American Countess is a river cruise paddlewheeler owned and operated by American Queen Voyages.

Kanesville Queen (1995-2016)
The casino boat Kanesville Queen was originally constructed for Harrah's Casino in Council Bluffs, Iowa and opened to the public on New Year's Day of 1996. In 2007, Iowa law was changed to allow casinos to operate fully onshore. After the revision of the law, Harrah's officials stated that the river vessel was no longer needed at their Council Bluffs casino and estimated it would save the company $2 million annually to retire the boat. In 2013, Kanesville Queen was sold as scrap to Newt Marine of Dubuque, Iowa.

Introduction as American Countess
Purchased by American Queen Steamboat Company in 2016, the dormant vessel was eventually brought to Gulf Island Shipyard in Houma, Louisiana to be cut in half and extended with a new 60-foot midsection in order to increase passenger capacity.

After many delays, the American Countess was finally launched on March 21, 2021, in New Orleans. The launch followed almost four years after the launch of American Duchess, another former Iowa casino boat that had been converted into an overnight cruise vessel by the same company.

See also
American Queen
American Duchess
American Empress
Delta Queen
Mississippi Queen

References

1995 ships
River cruise ships
Passenger ships of the United States
Council Bluffs, Iowa